Valdiviano, as well as referring to inhabitants of Valdivia, Chile, is a Chilean dish, consisting of a soup made with charqui (jerky) and onions.

History
In 1598, after the Disaster of Curalaba where the Spanish conquistadors lost almost half their territory in what was then the province of Chile, the city of Valdivia remained as one of the last Spanish strongholds. The soldiers isolated there were supplied with large amounts of jerky produced in central Chile. Tired of eating jerky, the soldiers created this dish, combining jerky with a few other ingredients to create the Valdiviano soup.

Ingredients

Charqui, cooking oil, onions, parsley, oregano, cumin, chilli.

Variations
Modern versions replace charqui for minced meat, similar to the preparation of Charquicán, or leftover pieces of meat from a barbecue.

See also
 
 Chilean Cuisine
 Valdivia, Chile
 Disaster of Curalaba
 Charquicán

External links 
Chilean food

Chilean soups